Konstantin Sergeyevich Panov (born June 29, 1980) is a Russian professional ice hockey right wing who currently plays for HSC Csíkszereda in the Erste Liga. He was drafted in the fifth round, 131st overall in the 1999 NHL Entry Draft by the Nashville Predators.

He has previously played for Traktor Chelyabinsk, Amur Khabarovsk, HC Lada Togliatti, HC Dynamo Moscow, SKA Saint Petersburg and HC Yugra in the Russian Superleague and the Kontinental Hockey League.

Career statistics

Awards and honours

References

External links

1980 births
Living people
Amur Khabarovsk players
HC Dynamo Moscow players
Kamloops Blazers players
HC Lada Togliatti players
HSC Csíkszereda players
Milwaukee Admirals players
Nashville Predators draft picks
SKA Saint Petersburg players
Toledo Storm players
Traktor Chelyabinsk players
HC Yugra players
Russian ice hockey right wingers
Russian expatriate ice hockey people
Russian expatriate sportspeople in the United States
Expatriate ice hockey players in the United States
Russian expatriate sportspeople in Romania
Expatriate ice hockey players in Romania
Russian expatriate sportspeople in Canada
Expatriate ice hockey players in Canada